The 2001 Supercopa de España was two-leg Spanish football matches played on 19 August and 22 August 2001. It was contested by Zaragoza, who were Copa del Rey winners in 2000–01, and Real Madrid, who won the 2000–01 La Liga title. Real Madrid won the Supercopa de España 4–1 on aggregate.

Match details

First leg

Second leg

References
 List of Super Cup Finals 2001 RSSSF.com

Supercopa de Espana Final
Supercopa de Espana 2001
Supercopa de Espana 2001
Supercopa de España